Laurence Michael Yep (born June 14, 1948) is an American writer. He is known for his children's books, having won the Newbery Honor twice for his Golden Mountain series. In 2005, he received the biennial Laura Ingalls Wilder Medal for his career contribution to American children's literature.

Life, education, and career 

Yep was born in San Francisco, California, in Chinatown to Thomas (Gim Lew) Yep and Franche Lee Yep. His father was a first-generation American born in China who had moved to San Francisco as a boy and grown up with an Irish friend in his neighborhood. His mother was a second-generation Chinese American, was born in Ohio and raised in West Virginia where her family ran a Chinese laundry. After struggling through the Great Depression, Yep's family moved to a multicultural but predominantly African American neighborhood. Yep grew up working in the family grocery store, where he recalls learning early on "how to observe and listen to people, how to relate to others. It was good training for a writer."

Yep was named by his older brother Thomas, who had just been studying the biography of Saint Lawrence for school. He spent his early childhood commuting from his neighborhood to a Catholic school in Chinatown for Chinese children, where he was often made fun of by the mostly bilingual students for only knowing how to speak English.

Not until high school when Yep attended a less segregated Catholic school did he confront white American culture in person, having grown up among Black and Chinese kids. Although he had always been interested in science, at St. Ignatius College Preparatory, he also became interested in literature and creative writing. Yep published his first story in a science fiction magazine at the age of 18 while still in high school. His English teacher, a Jesuit priest, motivated him to submit his story to magazines until it got published if he wanted to get an A grade. This experience inspired Yep to first consider what a career in writing might be like, even though he had always been fascinated with machines and wanted to become a chemist.

Yep graduated from St. Ignatius College Preparatory in 1966.

His decision to become a writer did not come until he entered college at Marquette University. There he became friends with a literary magazine editor, Joanne Ryder. She introduced him to children's literature and later encouraged him to write a book for children while she was working at Harper & Row. The result was his first science fiction novel for teens entitled Sweetwater, published by Harper & Row in 1973. After two years at Marquette, Yep transferred to UC Santa Cruz where he earned a BA in 1970. He later earned a PhD in English at the State University of New York at Buffalo.

Writing career 

Growing up, Yep often felt torn between mainstream American culture and his Chinese roots, a theme he has often written about. A great deal of his work involves characters feeling alienated or not fitting into their environment, something Yep has said he struggled with since childhood: "I was too American to fit into Chinatown, and too Chinese to fit in anywhere else."

During his writing career, Yep also taught creative writing and Asian-American studies at the University of California at Berkeley and UC Santa Barbara.

Yep's most notable collection of works is the Golden Mountain Chronicles, documenting the fictional Young family from 1849 in China to 1995 in America. Two of the series are Newbery Honor Books, or runners-up for the annual Newbery Medal: Dragonwings (Harper & Row, 1975) and Dragon's Gate (HarperCollins, 1993). Dragonwings won the Phoenix Award from the Children's Literature Association in 1995, recognizing the best children's book published twenty years earlier that did not win a major award. It won the Carter G. Woodson Book Award in 1976, and has been adapted as a play under its original title. Another of the Chronicles, Child of the Owl won the Boston Globe-Horn Book Award for children's fiction in 1977. (The Rainbow People, Yep's collection of short stories based on Chinese folktales and legends, was a Horn Book runner-up in 1989.)

Yep wrote two other notable series, Chinatown Mysteries and Dragon (1982 to 1992). The latter is an adaptation of Chinese mythology as four fantasy novels.

In 2005 the professional children's librarians awarded Yep the biennial Laura Ingalls Wilder Medal, which recognizes a living author or illustrator whose books, published in the United States, have made "a substantial and lasting contribution to literature for children". The committee noted that "Yep explores the dilemma of the cultural outsider" with "attention to the complexity and conflict within and across cultures" and it cited four works in particular: Dragonwings, The Rainbow People, The Khan's Daughter, and the autobiographical The Lost Garden.

A live-action/CGI TV movie of The Tiger's Apprentice, adapted by David Magee, was being developed by Cartoon Network until it was cancelled after Cartoon Network stopped developing live-action projects. In March 2019, Paramount Pictures announced an animated film adaptation of the book with a script by Magee and a release date of February 11, 2022.

Personal life 
Yep married Joanne Ryder in 1984. They live in Pacific Grove, California.

Works 
Golden Mountain Chronicles
As of 2011 there are ten published chronicles spanning 1835 to the present. Here they are ordered by the fictional history and the year of the narrative follows the title; none of the titles includes a date.
 The Serpent's Children, set in 1849 (1984)
 Mountain Light, 1855 (1985)
 Dragon's Gate, 1867 (1993)
 The Traitor, 1885 (2003)
 Dragonwings, 1903 (1975)
 Dragon Road, 1939 (2007); originally The Red Warrior
 Child of the Owl, 1960 (1977)
 Sea Glass, 1970 (1979)
 Thief of Hearts, 1995 (1995)
 Dragons of Silk, 1835–2011 (2011)

Dragon (fantasy series)
 Dragon of the Lost Sea
 Dragon Steel
 Dragon Cauldron
 Dragon War

Star Fisher series
 The Star Fisher
 Dream Soul (sequel to The Star Fisher)

Chinatown Mysteries
 The Case of the Goblin Pearls
 The Case of the Lion Dance
 The Case of the Firecrackers

City trilogy
 City of Fire
 City of Ice
 City of Death

The Tiger's Apprentice
 The Tiger's Apprentice: Book One
 Tiger's Blood: Book Two
 Tiger Magic: Book Three

Ribbons (untitled group of books)
 Ribbons
 The Cook's Family (sequel to Ribbons)
 The Amah (companion novel)
 Angelfish (sequel to The Cook's Family)

Later, Gator (untitled group of books)
 Later, Gator
 Cockroach Cooties
 Skunk Scout

Mia St. Clair (American Girl series)
 Mia
 Bravo, Mia!

Isabelle series
 Isabelle
 Designs by Isabelle
 To the Stars, Isabelle

Nonfiction
 American Dragons: Twenty-five Asian American Voices (editor)
 The Lost Garden (autobiography, part of the In my own Words series)

Picture books
 The Magic Paintbrush
 The Dragon Prince: A Chinese Beauty and the Beast Tale
 The Butterfly Boy
 The Shell Woman and the King: a Chinese folktale
 The Khan's Daughter: a Mongolian folktale
 The Ghost Fox
 The Boy Who Swallowed Snakes
 The Man who Tricked a Ghost
 The City of Dragons

Other books
 Seademons
 Tongues of Jade
 The Rainbow People
 Sweetwater
 Hiroshima: A Novella
 The Earth Dragon Awakes: the San Francisco Earthquake of 1906
 Lady of Ch'iao Kuo: Warrior of the South (part of The Royal Diaries series)
 The Journal of Wong Ming-Chung: A Chinese Miner (part of the My Name Is America series)
 Spring Pearl: The Last Flower (part of the Girls of Many Lands series)
 The Imp that Ate My Homework
 When the Circus Came to Town
 Kind Hearts and Gentle Monsters
 The Mark Twain Murders
 The Tom Sawyer Fires
 Shadow Lord (a Star Trek novel)
 Monster Makers, Inc.

Plays
 The Age of Wonders
 Dragonwings
 Pay the Chinaman (one-act)
 Fairy Bones (one-act)
 HI

See also

References

External links 
 
 
 The Dragon Lode: "Conversations with Yep and Soentpiet – Negotiation Between Cultures"
 

1948 births
American children's writers
American dramatists and playwrights of Chinese descent
American dramatists and playwrights
American historical novelists
American male dramatists and playwrights
American male novelists
American novelists of Chinese descent
Carter G. Woodson Book Award winners
Laura Ingalls Wilder Medal winners
Living people
Newbery Honor winners
People from Pacific Grove, California
Writers from San Francisco
Chinese-American culture in San Francisco